Stuart Parker (born 16 February 1954 in Preston) is an English former professional footballer and a current English non-league football manager. He is currently chairman of A.F.C. Blackpool.

Playing career
Parker began his career with Blackpool in 1972, making his debut under Bob Stokoe as a substitute in a 1–1 draw with Orient at Bloomfield Road on 16 September. He made two more appearances, both starts, during the remainder of the 1972–73 season.

He sat out the entirety of the domestic season of 1973–74, but appeared for the club in the "Caligaris" International (under-21) Tournament in northern Italy during the summer. He scored two goals in the final, against Napoli, as Blackpool became the first English club to win the tournament.

Parker made thirteen league appearances (eight starts, five substitute) in 1974–75. He scored his first goal for the club on 24 September, in a 4–0 home victory over Cardiff City. He scored his only other goal for the Tangerines in the very next game, four days later, a 3–1 win at Bristol Rovers. His final appearance for the club occurred in a 4–0 defeat at Manchester United in the final game of the season, on 26 April.

Parker signed for Drogheda United in January 1984 and on his debut won the only trophy in his career.

Managing career
Parker started his managerial career as Assistant Manager at the top Blackpool Sunday league side Mammas FC who won back to back Lancashire Sunday Trophy titles in the mid nineties before he became manager of Blackpool Mechanics in 2000. In 2005 he was appointed manager of Squires Gate, leaving the following year. He returned to Blackpool Mechanics as manager in 2007, with the club being renamed AFC Blackpool the following year. He remained manager until the end of the 2016–17, when he became club chairman.

Honours

As a player
Drogheda United
League of Ireland Cup – 1983/84

As a manager
A.F.C. Blackpool
 North West Counties Football League First Division Champions – 2010–11

References

External links
Topscorers Eredivisie, PTT-Telecompetitie, KPN Telecompetitie, KPN Eredivisie, Holland Casino Eredivisie 1956–2003
 Profile on Sparta fanzine "In the Winning Mood"

Living people
English footballers
1954 births
English Football League players
National League (English football) players
League of Ireland players
Eredivisie players
Footballers from Preston, Lancashire
Association football forwards
English expatriate footballers
Blackpool F.C. players
Southend United F.C. players
Chesterfield F.C. players
Sparta Rotterdam players
Blackburn Rovers F.C. players
K.V. Mechelen players
Bury F.C. players
Chester City F.C. players
Drogheda United F.C. players
Stockport County F.C. players
Witton Albion F.C. players
Runcorn F.C. Halton players
Barrow A.F.C. players
South Liverpool F.C. players
Northwich Victoria F.C. players
Hyde United F.C. players
A.F.C. Blackpool managers
Squires Gate F.C. managers
Expatriate footballers in the Netherlands
English expatriate sportspeople in the Netherlands
Expatriate association footballers in the Republic of Ireland
English expatriate sportspeople in Hong Kong
Expatriate footballers in Hong Kong
English football managers